HOXA10-HOXA9 readthrough is a gene that is unlikely to produce a protein product.

Function

This locus represents naturally occurring read-through transcription between the neighboring HOXA10 (homeobox A10) and HOXA9 (full description written out) genes on chromosome 7. The read-through transcript is a candidate for nonsense-mediated mRNA decay (NMD), and is unlikely to produce a protein product. [provided by RefSeq, Mar 2011].

References 

Human proteins